Jacob Atlee Beidler (November 2, 1852 – September 13, 1912) was an American businessman and politician who served three terms as a U.S. Representative from Ohio from 1901 to 1907.

Biography
Born in Tredyffrin Township, Chester County, Pennsylvania, Beidler attended the country schools, and Locke's Seminary, Norristown, Pennsylvania.
He moved to Ohio and settled in Willoughby in Lake County in 1873. He engaged in business as a coal dealer and later as an operator.

Beidler was elected a member of the city council of Willoughby in 1881.
He moved to his farm, "Belle Vernon," near Willoughby, in 1881 and engaged in raising dairy cattle.
He served as president of the Belle Vernon-Mapes Dairy Co..
He served as vice president of the Cleveland, Painesville & Eastern Railroad Co.
Presidential elector in 1896 for McKinley/Hobart.

Congress 
Beidler was elected as a Republican to the Fifty-seventh, Fifty-eighth, and Fifty-ninth Congresses (March 4, 1901 – March 3, 1907).

Owing to ill health he declined to be a candidate for renomination in 1906 to the Sixtieth Congress.

Later career 
He resumed his former business activities.
He served as president of the Rhodes & Beidler Coal Co.
He served as member of the State board of agriculture.

Death
He died at "Belle Vernon," near Willoughby, Ohio, September 13, 1912.
He was interred in Lake View Cemetery, Cleveland, Ohio.

Sources

1852 births
1912 deaths
People from Chester County, Pennsylvania
People from Willoughby, Ohio
Ohio lawyers
Burials at Lake View Cemetery, Cleveland
1896 United States presidential electors
19th-century American politicians
19th-century American lawyers
Republican Party members of the United States House of Representatives from Ohio